Tanka Basnet (born 12 December 1990) is a footballer from Nepal. He made his first appearance for the Nepal national football team in 2012. He plays for Nepal Army Club in 	Martyr's Memorial A-Division League.

References 

Living people
1990 births
Nepalese footballers
Nepal international footballers
Association football midfielders
Place of birth missing (living people)
Sportspeople from Kathmandu
21st-century Nepalese people